Eugen Böhringer (22January192219June2013) was a German racing driver and hotelier who spent the majority of his racing career on the Mercedes-Benz works team.  A specialist in grueling long-distance events, his crowning achievement was victory in the 1962 European Rally Championship.

Early life 

Eugen Böhringer was born on 22 January 1922 in Rotenberg, Stuttgart to Gottfried and Emma Böhringer. By 1925 the family owned a Mercedes-Knight 16/45 PS Tourenwagen, and Emma Böhringer was one of the first women in the Stuttgart area to have a driver's license. In 1928, his father started a bus service between Rotenberg and Untertürkheim for commuting employees of the Mercedes-Benz plant located there. Before becoming a driver, Eugen worked as a chef at the family's hotel and restaurant. His road to fame began with him entering a Mercedes-Benz W105 in local and regional competitions for a wager with friends.

Racing career 

Early successes brought a promotion to the Mercedes-Benz works team for 1960, and a second-place finish at Rallye Monte-Carlo behind the wheel of a Mercedes-Benz 220 SE Tourenwagen.  The "fintail"  saloons became his trademark, as he developed a reputation for nimble driving in rallies which often exceeded 5,000 kilometers.

Race results

1958 
 Stuttgart Solitude Rally, 1st place

1959 
 Stuttgart Solitude Rally, 1st place

1960 
 Rally Monte Carlo, 2nd place
 Coupe des Alpes, 2nd in class

1961 
 Rally Monte Carlo, 1st place in over 2000 cc class
 Tulpenrallye, 1st place
 Rally Acropolis, 1st place in over 2000 cc class
 Coupe des Alpes, 2nd place in class
 Rajd Polski, 1st place
 Liège–Sofia–Liège, 4th place
 Deutschland-Rallye, 2nd place

1962 
 Rally Monte Carlo, 2nd place overall, 1st in class
 Tulpenrallye, 1st in over 2000 cc class
 Rally Acropolis, 1st place
 Midnight Sun Rally Sweden, 5th place overall, 1st in class
 Rallye Solitude, 2nd place
 Rajd Polski, 1st place
 Liège–Sofia–Liège, 1st place
 Deutschland-Rallye, 2nd place

1963 
 Rally Acropolis, 1st place
 Internation ADAC 6-Hour-Race, 2nd in over 2500 cc class
 Deutschland-Rallye, 1st place
 Spa-Sofia-Liège, 1st place
 Argentine Touring Car Grand Prix, 1st place

1964 
 Rally Monte Carlo, 1st in over 2000 cc class
 Brands Hatch 6-Hour-Race, 1st in class
 6 Hours of Zolder, 3rd in class
 International ADAC 6-Hour-Race, 1st place
 Macau Touring Car Grand Prix, 1st place
 Spa-Sofia-Liège, 3rd place
 Argentine Touring Car Grand Prix, 1st place

1965 
 Rally Monte Carlo, 2nd overall, 1st in class

References

German racing drivers
1922 births
2013 deaths
European Rally Championship drivers